The 67th Indianapolis 500 was held at the Indianapolis Motor Speedway in Speedway, Indiana on Sunday, May 29, 1983. After finishing second three times (1977, 1978, 1980), winning the pole position twice (1977–1978), and being the fastest qualifier one additional time (1981), Tom Sneva finally shook his "bridesmaid" status and won his first Indianapolis 500. The win also represented the record seventh Indy victory that chief mechanic George Bignotti was involved with.

In the final twenty laps, three-time winner Al Unser Sr. was leading Tom Sneva. Unser was seeking his record-tying fourth Indy victory. His son, rookie Al Unser Jr. was several laps down, but was running right behind his father. Al Jr. created a firestorm of controversy when it appeared he was blocking Sneva intentionally to aid his father. After several anxious laps, Sneva finally slipped by both Unsers, pulled away, and claimed his long-awaited first and only Indy victory.

Rookie Teo Fabi headlined time trials by winning the pole position, and on race day he led the first 23 laps. Fabi's day was short, however, as he dropped out with a bad fuel gasket. The effort earned him the rookie of the year award. Fabi would go on to win four races during the season and finished second to Al Unser Sr. for the CART points championship.

The 1983 Indy 500 ushered in a new era of civility and stability in the sport of Indy car racing. After four years of conflict and organizational disputes between USAC and CART, the two sanctioning bodies came to an amicable truce. The Indianapolis 500 would be sanctioned singly by USAC, and officially would be part of the ceremonial Gold Crown championship. However, the race was now recognized on the CART schedule, and counted towards the 1983 CART PPG Indy Car World Series points championship. The field for the Indy 500 going forward would consist primarily of CART-based teams, along with numerous one-off ("Indy-only") entries. Despite various squabbles and minor technical differences between the sanctioning bodies, this arrangement would remain in place, with relative harmony, through 1995.

Background
The USAC technical committee issued a rule change for 1983, scaling back side skirts and declaring that "all bodywork or aerodynamic devices must be at least one inch above the bottom of the car's tub." During time trials, a total of 15 cars in the qualifying line would fail pre-qualifying technical inspection, raising tempers and drawing the ire of competitors. Some teams charged that USAC was inconsistent in their enforcement and their measuring, since they used a different (and possibly less-accurate) tool than the CART series officials utilized at other races. In addition, some teams claimed the first several cars in line were not scrutinized as heavily as those deeper in line.

The evolving aerodynamic rules coincided with the emergence of the Robin Herd-designed March chassis becoming the vehicle of choice for the mid-1980s. Coupled with the widely used Cosworth DFX engine, the "customer car" era began to dominate the sport of Indy car racing. Penske, among other teams, elected to scale back, or even abandon their in-house chassis programs in favor of the English-built March for the next few seasons. The March's aerodynamic advancements, downforce, and affordable cost were among the reasons it emerged as the favorite among the competitors. The "customer car" era also was popular with the smaller-budget teams, as it allowed them access to top equipment, leveling the playing field, and shrinking the differences between haves and the have-nots. The 1983 race would be the first of five consecutive Indy 500 victories for March Engineering.

Race schedule

Time trials
Pole day time trials was scheduled for Saturday May 14. Rain, however, kept cars off the track nearly all day. At 4:15 p.m., the track finally opened for practice, but it was brief and interrupted by several yellow lights. Officials closed the track at 5:49 p.m., without a single car making a qualifying attempt. On Sunday May 15, rain washed out the entire day. It was the first time since 1978 that not a single car qualified on the first weekend. Pole day time trials was moved to the second weekend.

Three-time winner Johnny Rutherford was sidelined after two major crashes. On May 8, he crashed in turn one, suffering minor injuries. On May 18, he suffered a more serious crash in turn 3. He broke his left foot and left ankle, and was forced to sit out the 1983 race.

Pole Day – Saturday May 21
Pole day started with Mike Mosley (205.372 mph) taking the top spot early on. Rick Mears, a favorite for the pole, had his effort fall short, and he qualified at 204.301 mph.

Tom Sneva was the next shot at the front row, but his speed of 203.687 mph was only third-fastest at the moment. The next car out was rookie Teo Fabi, who had raised eyebrows during the week, posting practice speeds near the top of the speed chart. Fabi set a new one-lap track record of 208.049 mph, and set a four-lap record of 207.395 mph, securing the pole position. Fabi became the first rookie to win the pole since Walt Faulkner in 1950.

A very busy day saw 42 attempts and 33 cars complete qualifying runs. For the first time in modern history, the field was filled to 33 cars in one day.

On a sad note, Tony Foyt Sr., the father of A. J. Foyt as well as his former chief mechanic, died after battling lung cancer. After qualifying on Saturday, A. J. Foyt flew to Houston to visit his ailing father. At 8 p.m., Tony Foyt Sr. lapsed into a coma, and died at 10 p.m.

Bump Day – Sunday May 22
The day opened with John Mahler (180.022 mph) on the bubble. Rain again hampered time trials, and the track did not open until nearly 2 p.m.

Phil Krueger wrecked during a practice run, and Gary Bettenhausen waved off a run after one lap over 193 mph.

At 4:14 p.m., Dennis Firestone completed a run of 190.888 mph, bumping Mahler. Moments later, rain began to fall, and the track was closed for the day. The 6 o'clock gun fired with several drivers, including Bettenhausen, Bill Alsup, Dick Ferguson all left sitting in line.

Starting grid

Alternates
First alternate: John Mahler (#92) – Bumped
Second alternate: none

Failed to qualify

Bill Alsup (#11) – Waved off
Dick Ferguson (#69) – Waved off
Bill Tempero (#15) – Waved off
Spike Gehlhausen (#47) – Incomplete qualifying attempt
Gary Bettenhausen (#28) – Incomplete qualifying attempt
Larry "Boom Boom" Cannon (#17) – in line when qualifying suspended
Tom Bigelow (#6)
Phil Caliva (#42)
Herm Johnson (#42, #81)
Jerry Karl (#61)
Sheldon Kinser (#42)
Phil Krueger (#46)
Greg Leffler (#64)
Al Loquasto (#86)
Harry MacDonald (#43)
Roger Rager (#88)
Jerry Sneva (#69) – replaced by Dick Ferguson
Bill Vukovich II (#83)
Ken Schrader (#98) – Wrecked in practice
Jim Buick  (#26) – Wrecked in practice
Rich Vogler (#8) – Wrecked in practice
Bob Harkey (#79) – Wrecked in practice, injured
John Paul Jr. (#12) – Wrecked in practice, injured
Pete Halsmer (#66) – Wrecked in practice, injured
Doug Heveron (#41, #61) – Wrecked in practice, injured
Johnny Rutherford (#40) – Wrecked in practice, injured
Desiré Wilson (#54) – Incomplete refresher test (blew engine)
Chuck Ciprich (#36) – Did not complete rookie test
Mark Alderson (#17) – Did not complete rookie test
Mack McClellan (#17) – Did not complete rookie test
Teddy Pilette (#42) – Did not complete rookie test
Amber Furst – Entry denied due to lack of experience

Race summary

First half
Rookie Teo Fabi took the lead from the pole position and led the first 23 laps. A. J. Foyt, who earlier in the week had attended his father's funeral, dropped out early with a broken transmission u-joint linkage. At almost the same time, George Snider, Foyt's other team car, dropped out with ignition failure. Both Foyt cars were out just beyond the 50-mile mark. After showing speed early, Fabi dropped out with a bad fuel gasket. During an early pit stop, the refueling mechanism failed, and fuel spilled around the car, but it did not ignite.

On lap 81, Johnny Parsons spun in front of Mario Andretti in turn one. Both cars crashed hard into the outside wall. It was Andretti's first ride at Indy with Newman/Haas Racing, and yet another misfortune for him at the 500.

Second half
First half contender Bobby Rahal dropped out with a punctured radiator. The lead in the second half was maintained by Tom Sneva and Al Unser Sr. Sneva's teammate Kevin Cogan, as well as Geoff Brabham were also running near the top five.

On lap 172, Tom Sneva led with Al Unser Sr. second. Sneva was right behind the lapped car of Mike Mosley when his pit crew put out the sign board for him to make his final pit stop. Seconds later, Mosley spun right in front of Sneva coming out of turn one and crashed into the outside wall. Mosely suffered a bruised foot in the wreck. Sneva veered to the inside and narrowly avoided the incident. Mosley's notable "Indy jinx" continued, and it would be his final lap at the Speedway - he was killed in a traffic accident less than a year later.

With the yellow out, Sneva pitted the next time around, his final scheduled pit stop of the day. Al Unser Sr. was also in the pits. Unser had a much faster pit stop, electing not to change tires, and came out in the lead. Sneva was now second.

Finish
The green flag came back out on lap 176 with Al Unser Sr. leading and Tom Sneva in second. As the cars were going through turn four, the 10th place car of rookie Al Unser Jr. (five laps down at the time) jumped the restart. He passed both Sneva and his father Al Sr. One lap later, Al Jr. allowed his father by, and settled in between his father and second place Tom Sneva. Over the next several laps, it became clear that Al Jr. was attempting to run interference for his father. Al Jr. was known to openly root for his father, and incidentally it was Al Sr.'s 44th birthday. As the race hit lap 180, officials started displaying Al Unser Jr. the blue flag.

While many feel Al Jr. did not actually make many onerous and intentional "blocking" moves, he did create a significant amount of "dirty air" for Sneva, and did not yield the preferred racing line. Despite the impedance, Al Sr. was not pulling away nor seemed able to extend his lead. The three cars continued to run very close together. As the laps dwindled, the controversy began to grow.

With 13 laps to go, Sneva pulled alongside Al Unser Jr. on the frontstretch. The two cars went side-by-side into turn one, but Al Jr. refused to give up the ground.

With ten laps to go, the three cars caught up to lapped traffic. Al Jr. got stuck behind the car of Dick Simon, and Sneva immediately pounced on the moment. Sneva veered down low, passed Al Jr. and Simon in consecutive corners, and set his sights on the leader. Down the backstretch, Sneva set up his pass and easily got by Al Unser Sr. going into turn three. He passed two more cars before the end of the lap and immediately began building a lead.

With an open track ahead of him now, Tom Sneva picked up the pace and put considerable distance between himself and Unser. Sneva cruised to victory, by a margin of 11.174 seconds. It was Sneva's first Indy 500 victory (after three previous runner-up finishes) and chief mechanic George Bignotti's record seventh Indy 500 victory.

After stirring up controversy, Al Unser Jr. ran out of fuel on the final lap. He stalled on the course before reaching the finish line, and was scored six laps down at the finish.

Post race
In post-race interviews, Al Unser Jr. admitted to running interference for his father, claiming he was trying to create "dirty air" and turbulence for Sneva. He stopped short, however, of calling it "blocking." Al Jr. was highly criticized for the actions, by both competitors and media. However, after the race USAC examined the incident, and issued no penalties for blocking, citing the fact that he did not actually break any written rules. Al Unser Sr. claimed he did not know what was going on behind him, because he lost one of his rear-view mirrors, and the other one was broken. Furthermore, Al Sr. noted that he made a miscalculation on his final pit stop, ordering his crew to not change tires. As a result, his handling went away in the closing laps. While Al Jr. and Sneva were sparring, Al Sr. was instead preoccupied with nursing his loose, ill-handling machine.

Sneva charged Al Jr. with jumping the restart and illegally passing the two leaders before the green came out. After the race Al Jr. was issued a two-lap penalty for passing two cars before the green light, but the penalty did not cost him any positions. Unser still finished in the top ten as the highest finishing rookie. However, he lost out on the rookie of the year award, which went to polesitter Teo Fabi.

Box score

* Mario Andretti was penalized one lap for running over Al Unser Jr's hose during a pit stop. Parsons and Andretti collided with one another on lap 81; the penalty put Andretti into 23rd place one lap behind Parsons.

** Al Unser Jr. was penalized two laps for passing cars under yellow before the lap 176 restart, taking him from +6 laps (where he ran out of fuel) to +8 laps.

Broadcasting

Radio
The race was carried live on the IMS Radio Network. Paul Page served as anchor for the seventh year. Lou Palmer reported from victory lane. The crew saw little change from 1982, but some of the assignments were shifted. Longtime radio veteran Luke Walton assumed his customary duty during the pre-race ceremonies of introducing the starting command. However, he did not serve as a pit reporter during the race itself. Walton would continue on the broadcast, but only in a limited role, through 1988.

Bob Forbes rode in one of the pace cars during the parade lap.

Lou Palmer maintained his traditional location at the far south end of the pits. However, the other pit reporters appeared to have lesser-defined zones for 1983. During the first half of the race, all pit reporters congregated around the leaders' pits, including roving reporter Bob Forbes. During the second half of the race, Jerry Baker moved up to the north pits and Chuck Marlowe covered the center pits. Forbes then moved to the garage area and track hospital, while Palmer stayed in the south end. Sally Larvick returned for her second race, conducting interviews throughout the broadcast.

For 1983, after a brief one-year change, the famous commercial out-cue was restored back to "Now stay tuned for the Greatest Spectacle in Racing." For the first time, the broadcast signed on at 10:00 a.m. local time, providing one-hour of pre-race coverage.

Television
The race was carried in the United States on ABC Sports on a same-day tape delay basis. Jim McKay returned as anchor, while Jackie Stewart reprised the host position in "ABC Race Central." Sam Posey returned to the booth as driver expert, while Jim Lampley made his first appearance, covering primarily the garages and medical center. Anne Simon, a sideline reporter at ABC Sports, joined the crew for in-depth features, and is believed to be the first female television reporter at Indy.

For the first time ever, the broadcast featured a RaceCam. On-board cameras were mounted in the cars of Rick Mears and Al Unser Sr., but both failed partway through the race.

The broadcast has re-aired on ESPN Classic starting in May 2011.

Gallery

Notes

See also
 1982–83 USAC Championship Car season

References

5. https://www.nytimes.com/1983/05/30/sports/sneva-takes-indianapolis-500-with-al-unser-sr-2d.html

Works cited
1983 Indianapolis 500 Day-By-Day Trackside Report For the Media
Indianapolis 500 History: Race & All-Time Stats - Official Site
1983 Indianapolis 500 Radio Broadcast, Indianapolis Motor Speedway Radio Network

Indianapolis 500 races
Indianapolis 500
Indianapolis 500
Indianapolis 500